Nikolaos Tsipouras was a Hellenic Army officer who fought in the Macedonian Struggle, the Balkan Wars, the North Epirote Struggle, World War I and the Asia Minor Campaign, retiring as a Major General.

Life 
Nikolaos Tsipouras was born on 1 June 1880 (O.S.) in the village of Platanos, in Nafpaktia. He enlisted in the Hellenic Army in October 1901. In 1905, Tsipouras joined the Greek armed guerrillas in Macedonia as part of the Macedonian Struggle, fighting in the Florina–Monastir area, and again in 1907–08 in the Veroia–Naoussa–Vodena area as leader of his own troop.

He fought in the Balkan Wars of 1912–13 as an officer in an Evzone battalion of the 8th Infantry Division in the Epirus front, and was wounded in the Battle of Bizani. After the end of the Balkan Wars he temporarily resigned his commission and joined the forces of the Autonomous Republic of Northern Epirus, commanding the Northern Epirote forces in the Leskovik–Kolonje district.

From 1917 he fought in the Macedonian front of World War I. He particularly distinguished himself in the Battle of Skra-di-Legen in May 1918, where he was wounded and received a field promotion to lieutenant colonel. In the Asia Minor Campaign, he served as deputy commander and later commander of the 53rd Infantry Regiment. He was once more distinguished during the long and successful retreat of his parent unit, the Independent Division, to the sea and Lesbos after the Battle of Dumlupinar. He continued his service as regimental and divisional commander, and retired with the rank of Major General on 10 October 1929.

On 2 June 1936, he was appointed as Minister Governor-General of Macedonia in the cabinet of Ioannis Metaxas, serving until 21 March 1937.

References

1880 births
20th-century deaths
Hellenic Army major generals
Greek military personnel of the Balkan Wars
Greek military personnel of the Greco-Turkish War (1919–1922)
Greek military personnel of World War I
People of the Macedonian Struggle
Governors-General of Macedonia
Northern Epirus independence activists
20th-century Greek people
People from Nafpaktia